Richard Arthur Teague (December 26, 1923 – May 5, 1991) was an American industrial designer in the North American automotive industry. He held automotive design positions at General Motors, Packard, and Chrysler before becoming Vice President of Design for American Motors Corporation (AMC), and designed several notable show cars and production vehicles including AMC's Pacer, Gremlin, and Hornet models, as well as the Jeep Cherokee XJ and either designed or assisted in the designing of later cars for Chrysler such as the Jeep Grand Cherokee and Neon after American Motors' buyout.

Early life
Teague's mother worked in the motion picture industry during the silent movie era. At five years of age Teague appeared in five episodes of Our Gang, playing the role of Dixie Duval, a girl. When he was six, he was seriously injured in a car accident near Pasadena, California, which was caused by a drunk driver. He lost several teeth, suffered a broken jaw, as well as sight in his right eye (leaving him without depth perception or stereoscopic vision), while his mother was left an invalid. A year later his father was killed in another automobile accident, also caused by a drunk driver.

While attending grade school in Los Angeles during the 1930s, Teague built model airplanes before turning to hot rods, since his schoolmates included Ed Iskendarian (who became a drag racer), and land speed racer Stuart Hilborn, as well as other car enthusiasts. He participated in time trials on a dry lake northeast of Los Angeles and was fond of saying that he "had a little gasoline in his blood."

Teague was exempt from service in the armed forces during World War II because of his visual impairment. After graduating from Susan Miller Dorsey High School in 1942, he worked as an aircraft technical illustrator for Northrop Corporation. His boss, Paul Browne, was a former designer at General Motors who suggested that Teague take night classes at the ArtCenter College of Design.

Early work

After World War II, Teague penned a design for a pre-Henry J economy car for Kaiser Motors. 

In 1947 he joined the General Motors design studios headed by Edmund Anderson, starting as an apprentice stylist and eventually graduating to the Cadillac advanced design group. He also worked on the 1950 Oldsmobile Rocket. The 1950s "saw some of the most beautiful and some of the most outlandish vehicles" and the head of the design department at General Motors liked chrome on cars. Teague described how two sets of overlay designs were made for Harley Earl to choose from. Both chrome trim sets had been put on one Oldsmobile prototype by mistake. Earl saw it and ordered it produced that way although the stylists were horrified.

Teague was dismissed from General Motors in 1952, and joined the Packard Motor Car Company as Chief Stylist, following John Reinhart's resignation. His first work there was a minor facelift on the Packard line for 1953, and when the Packard management under James J. Nance decided to re-launch the Clipper brand as a stand-alone make, separate from Packard, it was Teague who achieved the visual distinction between the two. He also designed several Packard show cars. These included the 1953 Balboa (whose canopied reverse-slant and lowering for ventilation rear window later appeared on the 1957 Mercury Turnpike Cruiser, 1958–1960 Lincoln Continental, and various Mercury models), the 1954 Packard Panther, and contributed with William Schmidt to the 1955 Request, whose principal designer was Dick Macadam.

The restyled Packard line for 1955 showed Teague's keen eye for detail and his ability to produce significant changes based on limited budgets. However, the company was not doing well following the purchase of struggling Studebaker Corporation in 1954. The last Teague design for Packard was the Executive, introduced in mid-1956 and derived from the Clipper Custom, launched just as sales of the luxury Packard line collapsed. Teague also designed the last Packard show car, the Predictor, plus a new Packard and Clipper lineup for 1957 that would have followed the general lines of the Predictor. The design was stillborn when the Detroit Packard operations were shut down completely in mid-1956. Lacking funds for all-new models, the Studebaker-Packard Corporation had to make use of existing and economical Studebaker designs. Working with little time and money, the stopgap 1957 Studebaker-based Packard models became known as "Packardbakers." The 1957 Packard Clipper, popularly derided as "a Studebaker wearing Packard makeup", was designed largely by Teague, and was intended as a temporary stopgap to keep the brand going until the company's fortunes improved and a "real" Packard model could again be made.

By 1957, the entire Packard styling team had moved to Chrysler Corporation and Teague became Chief Stylist. After leaving due to management conflicts, he went to work for an independent design firm on non-automotive assignments.

American Motors

Teague joined American Motors Corporation (AMC) as a member of Edmund E. Anderson's design team in 1959, and became principal designer when Anderson left in 1961. Teague's first assignment, according to designer James W. (Jim) Alexander, was to re-do the front sheetmetal on the 1961 Ambassador. The first cars influenced by Teague's styling were the 1963 Rambler Classic and Ambassador, AMC's first all-new models since 1956. With the ascendancy of Teague in the early 1960s, "AMC Styling began to be written of in a more positive manner" within the industry and automotive press.

Teague was Vice President at the automaker from 1964 until he retired from AMC in 1983. At his retirement, he joked that the only Detroit auto company he had not worked for was Ford.

Although he worked within tight budget restrictions at AMC, Teague sometimes referred to his times there as "Camelot". Designing several different cars from existing AMC stampings, he worked "relative miracles" compared to the spending norms in this industry. With little money to work with, he reconfigured the existing cars and parts in new ways. For example, he incorporated the doors from AMC's large-sized automobiles into his design for the new 1964 compact Rambler American.

The AMC Cavalier was one of the "Project IV" concept cars in the mid-1960s that demonstrated advanced techniques of interchangeable body panels and design symmetry. The right front and left rear fenders were identical, as well as the panels for doors, hood, and deck lid all interchanged. The automobile platforms designed by Teague featured numerous interchangeable door skins, glass, and more. For example, the front and rear bumpers on the 1970 AMC Hornet were made from the same stamping. This design talent yielded significant cost savings for the company.

Teague's work on the 1967-1969 AMC Ambassador proved that he "could do more with less than most any other car designer around -- usually because he had to." While the 1965 models were reskinned and rode on a longer wheelbase, Teague "came through handsomely with crisp, angular lines" that helped the Ambassador achieve record sales. The 1967 model year brought even greater change, in line with Roy Abernethy's longtime aim of matching Big Three models on almost every front, including an all-new Ambassador that "emerged as one of the decade's unsung good-lookers."

After a management change at AMC, Teague worked under Roy D. Chapin, Jr. who was also a sports car enthusiast. Teague developed production models that featured "excitement" such as the Javelin. This design evolved from two AMX prototypes that were part of the "Project IV" concept cars during 1966. Other top executives, such as Robert B. Evans, wanted Teague's two-seat AMX design to be brought to the market "very quickly." Teague originated a non-running show car in late-1965 and since he was a “two-seater kind of guy, the production American Motors AMX was his car." The new models offerings reflected AMC's strategy to shed its "economy car" image and appeal to a more youthful, performance-oriented market.

During the 1970s, "only a handful of cars had real personalities, and many of those came from the smallest U.S. producer, American Motors" under the direction of Teague.

When the automobile market was changing to a greater focus on quality and fuel efficiency, Teague characterized the work by his design team at AMC as "we still want to make cars with charisma; cars that stand out from the pack ... the future means the large look inside, away from the claustrophobic."

Teague worked on the design of the 1975 AMC Pacer, the first car with cab forward design. It was also the first 'wide-small' automobile that "gave drivers the impression they were driving a conventional large American." Its "styling was different and appealing in an offbeat sort of way" featuring large amounts of glass. The Pacer's low beltline prevented the side door window from lowering completely out of sight, so Teague designed the inner door panels with large bolsters." Anatole Lapine, the designer of the Porsche 928 body was inspired by the Pacer.

Teague received AMC Hall of Fame recognition as the 2012 "Person of American Motors" - an executive or employee of American Motors or subsidiary company that was instrumental to the success of the company.

Teague designs

British automotive writer Nick Georgano devotes a chapter to Teague in the book titled The Art of the American Automobile: the Greatest Stylists and their Work describing individuals whose creative talents made a difference in production and custom automobiles since the 1930s. According to the authors of the book,Yesterday's Tomorrows: Past Visions of the American Future, Teague was one of the people that "helped to transport us into the future." While serving as the chief stylist, Teague was called by Popular Mechanics to predict the design trends for automobiles in the 1960s. Together with Brooks Stevens, Teague presented ideas about future cars and vehicle technologies at the 1963 SAE congress in Detroit. Teague, "who is generally considered to have been a bit of a maverick" predicted an evolutionary process for automobiles that turned out to be right. Teague foretold improvements in conventional gasoline engines, while cars "would have greater variety of style now that glass could be shaped, and better suspension systems" In contrast to Stevens, Teague believed that the automobiles of 1970 would still be built to provide basic transportation, and not be "a home on wheels" powered by an advanced power plant “the size of a breadbox.”

During the early-1960s, Teague's styling team began developing an entirely new concept for AMC - a sporty fastback design. Teague knew that the automaker was just not willing to spend the millions of dollars needed for all-new tooling, his design team made imaginative use of existing tooling and create spin-offs from existing products. The results were proposals for which Teague selected the names for both: the Tarpon show car and the production Marlin. Although promoting the smaller version, Teague recalled that "Abernethy had decided that instead of a 2+2 we would build a 3+3 sports-type car."

Teague was responsible for the design of several AMC and Jeep vehicles. He developed the Gremlin, Pacer, Matador coupe, Rambler American, AMC Javelin, and AMX Hornet, and subsequently adapted AMC's compact platform for the Concord, Spirit and Eagle models. He was also responsible for a number of concept cars and lobbied for the production of several, including the compact Tarpon that ultimately led to the large Marlin. He also lobbied for continuing the two-seat AMX models after 1970.

The 1968 AMX GT was one of the Teague-designed concept cars which had some of their design elements incorporated into production models. For this short-wheelbase coupe he styled a truncated kammback tail which was then used on the 1970 Gremlin. He also designed the "Concept 80" series of show cars, built on variations of existing AMC platforms as ideas for possible future models.

Perhaps Teague's strongest effort ever was the "handsome design" of the 1970 AMX/3 that AMC developed with help on the chassis from Italian sports-car engineer Giotto Bizzarrini and road testing and development from BMW. Before he and his team of designers settled on the final design, a fiberglass pushmobile was made with the molds taken from the final clay mockup. Teague was instrumental in moving the car to production at a reasonable cost, but upcoming U.S. bumper regulations and other issues would have inflated its price beyond volume viability.

Teague was responsible for the Jeep Cherokee (XJ) that was launched in the United States in 1983. He described the practical and utilitarian appearance of the new SUV: "We didn't want to lose the flavor of the older Jeeps ... We wanted it to look like something you'd want to take into the rough country." The design was unchanged and remained in production through 2001 and in China to 2005. The Cherokee XJ was described by one automotive magazine in 2009 as "possibly the best SUV shape of all time", and was the last Teague design to go into production. Automotive journalist Robert Cumberford, writing for Automobile, called the Jeep XJ one of the 20 greatest cars of all time — for its design, and "possibly the best SUV shape of all time, it is the paradigmatic model to which other designers have since aspired." 

Starting in 1982, Teague worked on the first large cars sold by AMC since 1978, the front-drive sedan code named X-58, for introduction in late-1986. and a companion code named X-59, that was to debut for the 1988 model year. He achieved a roomy interior in an aerodynamic design, and the two-door model was to have featured hidden headlamps, but the coupe was never produced. Giorgetto Giugiaro penned the sharper-edged exterior design for the four-door sedan that went into production as the Eagle Premier.

Historian and collector

Teague was a noted automobile historian and collected classic and rare vehicles, as well as other auto memorabilia. He restored old cars as a hobby, including a 1904 Packard, one of the first produced, and had already owned 285 cars by 1970. Teague was a 4-wheel drive enthusiast before AMC bought Jeep, he owned several World War II models. At retirement, he mentioned that he had owned "400 or 500" cars. Teague's collection included a rare AMX/3. It was donated to the San Diego Automotive Museum along with most of his papers.

Awards
 Chilton's Automotive Industries magazine named Teague the 1976 "Man of the Year" for his designs and work on the AMC Pacer. In the award's 12-year history, this was the first time an automotive stylist was so honored.
 Teague was honored with the EyesOn Design 1999 "Lifetime Design Achievement Award" for his accomplishments as an automotive designer.

Family
Teague married his wife Marian A. Rose (1927-) in 1950. He had three children: Richard B. ("Rick", 1953-2002), Jeff (1956-2016), and daughter Lisa (Scarpelli). Jeff Teague was also an industrial designer and established two automotive and product design services firms: "Teague Design" and "JTDNA Design". Jeff was quoted as that he didn't "long for the vehicles of his father's days", but had sketched updated versions of his father's designs including the AMX/3.

Death
Teague died on 5 May 1991 after suffering a long illness.

Notes

Bibliography

External links
 
 
 

People in the automobile industry
American automobile designers
American Motors people
Chrysler designers
1923 births
1991 deaths
Packard people
Susan Miller Dorsey High School alumni
Automotive historians